Ctenotus essingtonii, also known commonly as Essington's ctenotus and the lowlands plain-backed ctenotus,  is a species of skink, a lizard in the family Scincidae. The species is endemic to the Northern Territory in Australia.

Etymology
The specific name, essingtonii, refers to the locality Port Essington, Australia.

Geographic range
C. essingtonii is found in the northern portion of the Northern Territory, including the Tiwi Islands.

Habitat
The preferred natural habitat of C. essingtonii is forest.

Description
It has five toes on each of its four feet. It is slender, with 26 scale rows at midbody.

Reproduction
Sexually mature individuals of C. essingtonii breed during the dry season. The species is oviparous.

References

Further reading
Cogger HG (2014). Reptiles and Amphibians of Australia, Seventh Edition. Clayton, Victoria, Australia: CSIRO Publishing. xxx + 1,033 pp. .
Gray JE (1842). "Description of some hitherto unrecorded species of Australian Reptiles and Batrachians". Zoological Miscellany 2: 51–57. (Tiliqua essingtonii, new species, pp. 51–52).
Storr GM, Smith LA, Johnstone RE (1999). Lizards of Western Australia. I. Skinks, Revised Edition. Perth: Western Australian Museum. 291 pp. .
Wilson S, Swan G (2013). A Complete Guide to Reptiles of Australia, Fourth Edition. Sydney: New Holland Publishers. 522 pp. .

essingtonii
Reptiles described in 1842
Taxa named by John Edward Gray